The 2022 Norwegian Women's Cup is the 45th season of the Norwegian annual knock-out football tournament. The first round was played in April and May 2022. The final is scheduled to be played on 5 November 2022.

Calendar
Below are the dates for each round as given by the official schedule:

Source:

First round
10 teams from 1. divisjon and 34 teams from 2. divisjon entered the first round. All Toppserien teams received a bye in this round.

Second round
The pair-ups for the second round were announced on 5 May 2022. The 10 Toppserien teams entered this round.

Third round
The pair-ups for the third round were announced on 30 May 2022. All the matches were played on 15 June.

Quarter-finals
The draw for the quarter-finals was made on 23 June 2022.

Semi-finals
The draw for the semi-finals was made on 24 August 2022.

Final

Top scorers

References

Norwegian Women's Cup seasons
Norwegian Women's Cup
Cup